("Our Bahrain"; also known as  , "the national anthem of Bahrain") is the national anthem of Bahrain. Originally composed as an instrumental in 1942, lyrics were added in 1985, which were changed in 2002 following the country's transformation from an emirate into a kingdom.

History
The anthem was originally composed in 1942 to be played at official events such as receptions, making Bahrain one of the first Arab countries to adopt a national anthem. The leaders of the police band made many modifications and additions to the music over the following years, most significantly in 1972, a year after Bahrain's independence from the United Kingdom, when it was extended by playing it twice.

In 1985, former leader of the police band Colonel Mohamed Sudqi Ayyash wrote lyrics for the anthem, which were used until 2002. That year, with the emergence of the National Action Charter and a constitutional amendments referendum that declared the country's ruler Hamad ibn Isa Al Khalifah a king and the country a kingdom, the lyrics were changed by Minister of the Royal Court Khalid bin Ahmed Al Khalifa. Bahraini composer and singer Ahmed Aljumairi was directed by the government to re-arrange the national anthem with an inclusion of a fanfare that was recorded with the London Philharmonic Orchestra in London. Mr. Ahmed Aljumairi sang the national anthem with the chorus in that recording that became the official anthem of the country. Band leader Major General Mubarak Najm Al-Najm made a military band version arrangement that is used by the police.

Lyrics

Current lyrics

Former lyrics (1985–2002)

Notes

References

External links 
 Bahrain: Bahrainona - Audio of the national anthem of Bahrain, with information and lyrics (archive link)
 Himnuszok - A vocal version of the Anthem, featured in the Himnuszok website.

Asian anthems
Bahraini music
National symbols of Bahrain
National anthem compositions in D major